Crossorhombus is a genus of small lefteye flounders native to the Indian and West Pacific Oceans.

Species
There are currently five recognized species in this genus:
 Crossorhombus azureus (Alcock, 1889) (Blue flounder)
 Crossorhombus howensis Hensley & J. E. Randall, 1993 (Lord Howe Island flounder)
 Crossorhombus kanekonis (S. Tanaka (I), 1918)
 Crossorhombus kobensis (D. S. Jordan & Starks, 1906) (Kobe flounder)
 Crossorhombus valderostratus (Alcock, 1890) (Broadbrow flounder)

References

Bothidae
Marine fish genera
Taxa named by Charles Tate Regan